The 2020 SaskTel Tankard, the provincial men's curling championship for Saskatchewan, was held from January 29 to February 2 at the Horizon Credit Union Centre in Melville, Saskatchewan. The winning Matt Dunstone rink will represent Saskatchewan at the 2020 Tim Hortons Brier in Kingston, Ontario, Canada's national men's curling championship.

Matt Dunstone won his 2nd SaskTel Tankard when he defeated former teammate Kirk Muyres 4–2 in the final.

Teams
The teams are listed as follows:

Knockout Draw Brackets

A Event

B Event

C Event

Playoffs

A vs. B
Saturday, February 1, 7:00 pm

C1 vs. C2
Saturday, February 1, 7:00 pm

Semifinal
Saturday, February 2, 9:30 am

Final
Sunday, February 2, 2:30 pm

References

External links

2020 Tim Hortons Brier
Curling in Saskatchewan
2020 in Saskatchewan
SaskTel Tankard
SaskTel Tankard